Bear Ranch Creek is a stream located in Butte County, northern California, United States.

It is a tributary of the Feather River, flowing from the Sierra Nevada into Lake Oroville.

References

Rivers of Butte County, California
Tributaries of the Feather River
Rivers of Northern California